Augustine K. Nketia (born 30 December 1970 in Kumasi, Ghana) is a former track and field competitor, specialising in sprinting events, who represented both his home country and New Zealand.

Nketia represented Ghana until 1991 including the 1990 Commonwealth Games. He competed for New Zealand at the 1994 Commonwealth Games and the 1996 Summer Olympics in Atlanta. His New Zealand Olympic athlete number is 733. He set the New Zealand national 100m record of 10.11 in 1994 and held it for 28 years before it was eclipsed by his son Eddie Osei-Nketia in 2022, and won five national titles over that distance.

Personal bests

References
Athletes at the Games by John Clark, page 170 (1998, Athletics New Zealand)

External links

1970 births
Living people
Ghanaian male sprinters
New Zealand male sprinters
Commonwealth Games competitors for Ghana
Athletes (track and field) at the 1990 Commonwealth Games
Commonwealth Games competitors for New Zealand
Athletes (track and field) at the 1994 Commonwealth Games
Olympic athletes of New Zealand
Athletes (track and field) at the 1996 Summer Olympics
World Athletics Championships athletes for New Zealand
Sportspeople from Kumasi
New Zealand people of Ghanaian descent
Ghanaian emigrants
Naturalised citizens of New Zealand